Juana Mosquera (born 19 July 1950) is a Colombian sprinter. She competed in the women's 100 metres at the 1972 Summer Olympics. She won a bronze medal in the 4 x 100 metres relay at the 1971 Pan American Games.

References

1950 births
Living people
Athletes (track and field) at the 1972 Summer Olympics
Colombian female sprinters
Olympic athletes of Colombia
Athletes (track and field) at the 1971 Pan American Games
Pan American Games bronze medalists for Colombia
Pan American Games medalists in athletics (track and field)
Place of birth missing (living people)
Medalists at the 1971 Pan American Games
Olympic female sprinters
20th-century Colombian women